DirectAdmin is a graphical web-based web hosting control panel allowing administration of websites through a web browser. The software is configurable to enable standalone, reseller, and shared web hosting from a single instance.  DirectAdmin also permits management of server tasks and upgrades to package software (such as Apache HTTP Server, PHP, and MySQL ) from within the control panel - simplifying server and hosting configuration.

System requirements 
DirectAdmin is compatible with several versions of CloudLinux, Red Hat, Fedora Core, Red Hat Enterprise Linux, CentOS, FreeBSD, Ubuntu and Debian.

 Processor: 500 MHz
 Memory: 1 GB (2 GB is preferred), with at least 2 GB of swap memory
 HDD Space: minimal 2 GB free space (after the Linux install)

See also
 Installatron
 cPanel
 Domain Technologie Control
 Hosting Controller
 ISPConfig
 Kloxo
 Webmin
 NeHoX

References

External links 
 
 DirectAdmin knowledge base
 Official forum

Web server management software